"Love It When You Call" is the fourth single from English rock band the Feeling's 2006 debut album, Twelve Stops and Home. The song was released on 20 November 2006 and peaked at No. 18 on the UK Singles Chart, becoming the band's fourth top-20 single.

The Feeling played this song live for Children in Need 2006. They also performed it as part of the BBC One New Year's Eve 2006 celebrations and at the Concert for Diana the following year. An edited version of the song also appeared in the 2007 film Good Luck Chuck in which the lyrics "but you never call at all" were cut out.

Music video
The video for the song (based on the film Casino) features the band dressed both as gangsters and FBI agents. One member of the gangsters makes a deal with the FBI, leading to a shoot-out at the end of the video.

Track listings
UK CD single
 "Love It When You Call"
 "The Child"
 "Don't Give Up" (acoustic version)
 "Love It When You Call" (U-Myx)

UK 7-inch single
A. "Love It When You Call"
B. "Do You Want It?" (Late Night Shed Experiment)

Charts

Weekly charts

Year-end charts

Certifications

Cover versions
In 2006, the song was parodied by British DJ Chris Moyles, when he recorded his own version, "The Davina McCall Song". Kerry Ellis included her version of the song on her debut album Anthems (2010).

References

2006 singles
2006 songs
The Feeling songs
Island Records singles
Songs written by Ciaran Jeremiah
Songs written by Dan Gillespie Sells
Songs written by Kevin Jeremiah
Songs written by Paul Stewart (musician)
Songs written by Richard Jones (The Feeling)
Universal Records singles